Mount Timpanogos Wilderness is a  wilderness area protecting Mount Timpanogos and the surrounding area. It is located in the front range of the Wasatch Mountain Range, between American Fork Canyon on the north and Provo Canyon on the south, within the Uinta-Wasatch-Cache National Forest on the north eastern edge of Utah County, Utah, United States.  The wilderness area receives fairly heavy use due to its proximity to the heavily populated cities of Provo and Salt Lake City.  It is bordered on the north by the Lone Peak Wilderness.

Flora and fauna
Below the tree line on Mount Timpanogos are vast forests of aspen, Douglas fir, subalpine fir, limber pine, Gambel oak, maple, and chokecherry. Common flowers in the wilderness include forget-me-not, alpine buttercup, bluebell, arnica, larkspur, yarrow, sulfur buckwheat, geranium, and columbine.

Some common wildlife found in Mount Timpanogos Wilderness include Rocky Mountain goat in the Emerald Lake region, as well as mule deer, elk, moose, mountain lion, black bear, and several species of raptor.

Recreation
Due to its close proximity to Salt Lake City and Provo, Mount Timpanogos Wilderness sees a relatively large number of visitors. The most common recreational activity in the wilderness is hiking.

B-25 crash site
On March 9, 1955, a U.S. Air Force B-25 crashed on the east side of Mount Timpanogos. Bound for March Air Force Base in Riverside, California, the pilot was apparently disoriented by poor weather conditions. Three crewmembers and two passengers died in the crash. A  trail to the crash site leaves the main Timpooneke trail at the lip of Timpanogos Basin.

See also
 List of U.S. Wilderness Areas
 Wilderness Act

References

External links

 Mount Timpanogos Wilderness - Wilderness.net
 Mount Timpanogos - Climb-Utah.com
 Mount Timpanogos - UtahTrails.com

IUCN Category Ib
Protected areas of Utah County, Utah
Wilderness areas of Utah
Wasatch-Cache National Forest
Timpanogos, Mount Wilderness
1984 establishments in Utah
Protected areas established in 1984